Gol Akhar (also Romanized as Gol Ākhar and Gol Ākher; also known as Gol Ākhūr, Gol Ākhvor, Kurah Haz, and Qara Khar) is a village in Ujan-e Gharbi Rural District, in the Central District of Bostanabad County, East Azerbaijan Province, Iran. At the 2006 census, its population was 813, in 158 families.

References 

Populated places in Bostanabad County